Kazimierz Kaczor (24 November 1895 – 17 April 1972) was a Polish footballer. He played in three matches for the Poland national football team from 1923 to 1925.

References

External links
 

1895 births
1972 deaths
Polish footballers
Poland international footballers
Association footballers not categorized by position
Sportspeople from Kraków